Pontogeneia may refer to:
Pontogeneia (fungus), a genus in the Sordariomycetes
Pontogeneia (crustacean), a genus in the Amphipoda